The Buckeye Eagle is an American powered parachute that was designed and produced by Buckeye Industries of Argos, Indiana.

Design and development
It features a parachute-style high-wing, single-place accommodation, tricycle landing gear and a single  Rotax 447 engine in pusher configuration. The  Rotax 503 engine was a factory option.

The Eagle is built from a combination of bolted aluminium and 4130 steel tubing. In flight steering is accomplished via foot pedals that actuate the canopy brakes, creating roll and yaw. On the ground the aircraft has lever-controlled nosewheel steering. The main landing gear incorporates spring rod suspension. The aircraft was factory supplied in the form of an assembly kit that requires 30–40 hours to complete.

The Eagle has a conversion kit that allows exchanging the parachute wing for a hang glider-style wing to convert the aircraft into an ultralight trike.

Specifications (Eagle)

References

1990s United States ultralight aircraft
Single-engined pusher aircraft
Powered parachutes